Euchloe ausonia dephalis, the pearl white, is a small butterfly of the family Pieridae, that is, the yellows and whites, which is found in India. It is a subspecies of the eastern dappled white (Euchloe ausonia).

See also
Pieridae
List of butterflies of India (Pieridae)

References
 
  
 
 
 

Euchloe
Butterflies of Asia
Butterfly subspecies